Fredericia HK  is a handball club from Fredericia, Denmark. Currently, Fredericia HK competes in the men's Danish Handball League. The home arena of the team is Fredericia Idrætscenter The club was founded in 1990 on the license of former 5 time Danish champions Fredericia KFUM (YMCA).

Achievements
Danish Championship (5x) (all as Fredericia KFUM)
1975, 1976, 1977, 1978, 1979
Limburgse Handbal Dagen (1x)
2003
 Double
 Winners (2): 1975–76, 1976–77

Men's team

Staff

Current squad
Squad for the 2022-23 season

Goalkeeper
 1  Kim Sonne 
 12  Emil Tellerup
 16  Thorsten Fries
Wingers
LW
 9  Martin Bisgaard
 10  Mads Emil Lenbroch
 15  Lukas Klarskov
RW
 7  Kasper Young Andersen
 11  Jakob Frederiksen
Pivots
 4  Nikolaj A. Nielsen
 5  Rasmus Meyer Ejlersen
 6  Jonas Raundahl

Back players
LB
 13  Lasse Balstad
 23  Einar Olafsson
 24  James Scott Junior
 97  Reinier Taboada
CB
 3  Jonas Kruse Kristensen
 17  Kristian Stoklund
 88  Nicolaj Nørager
RB
 14  Nikolaj Juhl Petersen
 20  Mads Christiansen
 93  Anders Kragh Martinusen

Transfers
Transfers for the season 2023-24

 Joining
  Sebastian Frandsen (GK) (from  FC Porto)
  Sebastian Henneberg (CB) (from  RK Eurofarm Pelister)
  Jonas Langerhuus (RB) (from  HC Midtjylland)
  Fredrik Mossestad (RW) (from  IFK Skövde)

 Leaving
  Lasse Folkman (AC) (to  SønderjyskE Håndbold)
  Kim Sonne (GK) (to  HC Midtjylland)
  Emil Tellerup (GK) (to  Lemvig-Thyborøn Håndbold)
  Mads Emil Lenbroch (LW) (to  Bjerringbro-Silkeborg Håndbold)
  Malte Pedersen (LB) (to  TM Tønder)
  Nicolaj Nørager (CB) (to  TTH Holstebro)
  Jonas Raundahl (P) (to  Nordsjælland Håndbold)

Women's team

Staff
Staff for the 2018-19 season

Current squad
Squad for the 2018-19 season

Goalkeeper
 1  Mia Nygaard Hansen
 12  Kia Uttrup Petersen
 16  Kira Nyboe Jensen
Wingers
LW
 8  Mette Lassen
 10  Signe Mølby
 22  Mathilde Lund Niess
RW
 6  Maria Husted
 11  Janne Brøndum Henriksen
Pivots
 14  Lærke Holm
 20  Laura Lund Ditlevsen

Back players
LB
 18  Maria Højgaard Klausen
 24  Hulda Dagsdóttir
CB
 4  Ida Skou Møller
 9  Janne Haudrum
 25  Signe Ulstad
RB
 3  Anne Berggreen
 7  Nadja Martinsen

Transfers
Transfers for the 2018-19 season

Joining
  Ana Razdorov-Lyø (Coach) (from own rows)
  Laura Kirchorff Madsen (CB) (from  Team Esbjerg)

Leaving
  Marie Andressen (GK) (to  SV Werder Bremen)
  Ida Lagerbon (LB) (to  Ringkøbing Håndbold)
  Camilla Aastrup (P) (to  SønderjyskE Håndbold)

References

External links
www.fhk.dk

Danish handball clubs
Association football clubs established in 1990
1990 establishments in Denmark
Sports clubs founded by the YMCA
Fredericia